L² is an independent social liberal youth organization. Until the end of 2009, it was the official youth wing of SLP, a Flemish political party, located in Flanders, Belgium. The organisation has about 500 members aged between 16 and 30. The organisation is a member of the European Liberal Youth (LYMEC) and the International Federation of Liberal Youth (IFLRY).

According to the official website it is a "left-liberal organisation".

External links
  
  

Political youth organisations based in Belgium
Liberal organizations